Julie Gilbert (born July 21, 1946) is a writer. 

Her father, Henry Goldsmith, was a publisher, and her mother, Janet, was an actress. She attended Boston University and worked as a professional actress, writer and teacher. 

She has written biographies, novels and plays, including Umbrella Steps (adapted into film) and Ferber: The Biography of Edna Ferber and Her Circle, which was nominated for the National Book Critics Circle Award. She received a Pulitzer Prize nomination for Opposite Attraction: The Lives of Erich Maria Remarque and Paulette Goddard.

Notes

Living people
1946 births
Writers from New York (state)
Boston University alumni